The 2005 Atlantic 10 Conference Baseball Championship was held from May 25 through 28 at Fifth Third Field in Dayton, OH. It featured the top two regular-season finishers of each six-team division, plus the next two best finishers. Top-seeded Rhode Island defeated George Washington in the title game to win the tournament for the first time, earning the Atlantic 10's automatic bid to the 2005 NCAA Tournament.

Seeding and format 
The league's top six teams, based on winning percentage in the 24-game regular season schedule, qualified for the field. The top two teams in each division qualified for the tournament automatically; the two division winners, Rhode Island in the East and George Washington in the West, received the top two seeds and byes through to the second round of the double elimination tournament.

Bracket

All-Tournament Team 
The following players were named to the All-Tournament Team. Rhode Island second baseman Wayne Russo, one of four Rams selected, was named Most Outstanding Player.

Rhode Island's Josh Nestor (2004) and George Washington's Ryan Roberson (2003) were second-time selections.

References 

Tournament
Atlantic 10 Conference Baseball Tournament
Atlantic 10 Conference baseball tournament
Atlantic 10 Conference baseball tournament
Baseball in Dayton, Ohio
College baseball tournaments in Ohio
Sports competitions in Dayton, Ohio